Jeshoreshwari Kali Temple is a famous Hindu temple in Bangladesh, dedicated to the goddess Kali. The temple is located in Ishwaripur, a village in Shyamnagar upazila of Satkhira. The name "Jeshoreshwari" means "Goddess of Jeshore".

Legend 
Jeshoreshwari is regarded as one of the 51 Peeth of Sati; according to the belief, it is where the various parts of Sati's body are said to have fallen. Jeshoreshwari represents the site where the palm of Sati fell. Legend says that the General of Maharaja Pratapaditya discovered a luminant ray of light coming from the bushes, and came upon a piece of stone carved in the form of a human palm. Later, Pratapaditya started worshiping Kali, building the Jeshoreshwari Kali Temple. As to be the "Goddess of Jessore", it was named after Jessore.

The Jeshoreshwari Shrine as a Shakti Peeth
Palms of hands and soles of the feet

The mythology of Daksha yaga and Sati's self-immolation is the story behind the origin of Shakti Peethas. Shakti Peethas divine places or holy abode of the Mother Goddess(Parashakti). These shrines are believed to be sanctified with the presence of Shakti due to the falling of body parts of the corpse of Sati Devi, when Lord Shiva carried it and wandered throughout Aryavartha in sorrow. There are 51 Shakti Peeth located all around South Asia. Each temple have shrines for Shakti and  Kalabhairava, The Shakti of this shrine is addressed as Jeshoreshwari and Bhairava as Chanda.

History 

It is believed to have created by a brahman named Anari. He created a 100-door temple for the Jeshoreshwari Peeth. But the timeline is not to be known. Later it has been renovated by Lakshman Sen and Pratapaditya in their reigning periods.

Worship and rituals

The temple is visited by pilgrims from all over, irrespective of sectarian differences. Worship is done by the priest every Saturday and Tuesday at noon time. But before 1971, there was a daily routine of worship. Every year on the day of Kali puja, the present Caretakers of the temple conduct a ceremony. There is also a Mela taking place around the temple compound.

'Natmondir' and architecture
A large rectangular covered platform called Natmondir has been erected adjacent to the main temple, from where the face of the goddess can be seen. This was renovated by Laxman Sen in the late 13th century, but the builders are not known. After 1971, it crumbled. Now only the pillars can be seen.

Indian Prime Minister Narendra Modi's visit to the Kali Temple in Jeshoreshwari 
Indian Prime Minister Narendra Modi visited the Jeshoreshwari Kali Temple in Shyamnagar upazila of Satkhira on March 27, 2021. Shyamnagar was decorated around the arrival of Modi in this historical temple located in Ishwaripur of the upazila. Six helipads were built in the area, including the grounds of Sobhan Multipurpose Secondary School in Ishwaripur, for the landing of helicopters carrying Modi and his entourage. The road he took to the temple area after getting off the helicopter was being renovated earlier. Members of the power department worked to ensure an uninterrupted power supply. If he wanted to stay there before and after visiting the temple, work was underway to equip two guest rooms of the temple as well as construct toilets with alternative restrooms.

The broken part of the wall had already been repaired by painting the temple and the wall. At the entrance of the temple, a 200-year-old Battala section was being closed and a wide attic is being built with a mixture of bricks and stones.

This was the first visit of a head of government of any country to Shyamnagar, though ministers and dignitaries from different countries have visited Jeshoreshwari Kali Mandir before. And, that is why the arrival of Modi has created a festive atmosphere all over Satkhira including Shyamnagar. High-level delegations from both the countries have already visited Shyamnagar more than once to check the security situation surrounding Narendra Modi's visit.

References

External links 

 Jeshore Khulnar Itihash by Satish Chandra Mitra, pp. 87, 100, 551.
 Baghrotot Parikraman: Satkhira Zillar Itihash O Oitijhyo by Jyoti Chattopadhyay, p. 105.
 Sunderban-er Itihash by AFM Abdul Jalil

Hindu temples in Khulna Division
Hindu temples in Satkhira district
Shakti Peethas
13th-century Hindu temples